Alejo José Vélez Cucalón (born 1 May 1968) is a paralympic athlete from Spain competing mainly in category F11 jumping events.

Vélez competed in his first paralympics in his home country in 1992 as well as travelling to Atlanta for the 1996 Summer Paralympics. In 1992 he competed in the long jump, triple jump and pentathlon finishing fifth, fourth and eighth as well as setting a new paralympic games record in the high jump to win gold by 20 cm.  He failed to register a performance in the 1996 long jump and then despite jumping higher than four years ago lost out to Belarusian Oleg Chapel in the high jump.

Notes

References

External links
 
 

1968 births
Living people
Spanish male long jumpers
Spanish male high jumpers
Spanish male triple jumpers
Paralympic athletes of Spain
Paralympic gold medalists for Spain
Paralympic silver medalists for Spain
Paralympic medalists in athletics (track and field)
Athletes (track and field) at the 1992 Summer Paralympics
Athletes (track and field) at the 1996 Summer Paralympics
Medalists at the 1992 Summer Paralympics
Medalists at the 1996 Summer Paralympics
Visually impaired long jumpers
Visually impaired high jumpers
Visually impaired triple jumpers
Paralympic long jumpers
Paralympic high jumpers
Paralympic triple jumpers